"Global majority" is a collective term for ethnic groups which constitute approximately 85 percent of the global population. It has been used as an alternative to terms which are seen as racialized like "ethnic minority" and "person of color" (POC), or more regional terms like "visible minority" in Canada and "Black, Asian and Minority Ethnic" (BAME) in the United Kingdom.

Terminology 
The term was used as early as 2003 as a way to challenge the normativity of a white majority or Eurocentric perspective. Its proponents argue that terms like "ethnic minority" marginalize the skills, the ways of thinking, and the lived experiences of those from African, Asian, indigenous, or dual-heritage backgrounds. Collectively, these groups are said to constitute 85 percent of the global population. Therefore, terms like ethnic minority, person of color, visible minority, and BAME were criticized as racializing ethnicity.

However, the term "global majority" has been challenged on several fronts. It does not include white ethnic groups that are cultural minorities in white majority societies, such as Irish, Jews, and travellers in the United Kingdom. It is also seen as using "majority" out of context and, thereby, distorting language.

Canada 
The term visible minority is a legal term used in different sectors of the Canadian government, and has been defined by Employment Equity Act as "someone (other than an Indigenous person...) who is non-white in colour/race, regardless of place of birth." The term is likewise used by Statistics Canada, although it is currently under consultative review.

In certain parts of Canada, like Vancouver and Toronto, "visible minorities" make up the majority of the population. Advocates of "global majority" argue that the term "visible minority" creates a racialized group, in contrast with the white Canadian population.

United States 
In the United States, the term "global majority" has been used since the early-2000s as a way to refer to developing countries. Organizations like the "Global Majority," founded by California senator Bill Monning, focus on non-violent conflict resolution with respect to global disputes. Likewise, the American University in Washington, DC offers a general education undergraduate course on the subject that focuses on developing countries. Since 2010, the American University has published a student Global Majority E-Journal connected to this course.

However, since the COVID-19 pandemic, the term has been used as a way to speak about racism in the United States. Some prefer the term over "person of color," as the latter focuses on a historical binary between African Americans as "colored people" and "color-free white people," thereby emphasizing race and white centrality. "Global majority" has been seen as a way to highlight race-related psychological processes and to place greater emphasis on less prominent voices in white-dominated spaces.

United Kingdom 
In the midst of the Black Lives Matter protests in the United Kingdom, there was a growing debate around how best to describe different ethnic groups. This led to the creation of the UK government "Commission on Race and Ethnic Disparities," which concluded in March 2021 that the term BAME was "unhelpful and redundant."

In 2020, the Church of England created an Archbishops' Anti-Racism Taskforce to examine racism in the church. At the time, it primarily used the term "United Kingdom Minority Ethnic" (UKME). When the taskforce's report was published in April 2021, it chose a broader description of "United Kingdom Minority Ethnic/Global Majority Heritage" (UKME/GMH) as more appropriate than BAME. The language of "Global Majority Heritage" is seen as a reminder that minorities often come from a majority culture before migrating to the UK. However, some have rejected the term because it is seen as associated with critical race and intersectional theories.

In November 2022, the Labour-run Westminster City Council committed to replace BAME with "global majority." However, Conservative MP John Hayes remarked that the change was part of the "liberal left agenda" and said "Minorities and majorities are about the context — you can't use the term 'majority' out of context and assume it affords some sort of accurate description" and that the change of language is "deeply sinister and must be resisted at every turn."

See also 
 British East and Southeast Asian

References 

Majority–minority relations
Ethnicity
Ethnic groups in Canada
Ethnic groups in the United States
Ethnic groups in the United Kingdom
Race and society
Race in Canada
Race in the United States
Linguistic controversies